Rupture may refer to:

General
 Rupture (engineering), a failure of tough ductile materials loaded in tension

Anatomy and medicine

 Abdominal hernia, formerly referred to as "a rupture"
 Achilles tendon rupture
 Rupture of membranes, a "water breaking" event of pregnancy
 Premature rupture of membranes, when the amniotic sac ruptures more than an hour before the onset of labor
 Ruptured spleen
 Testicular rupture, a rip  or tear in the connective tissue covering of the testes
 Breast implant#Implant rupture, a rupture of breast implants

Other uses 

 Steam rupture, a rupture in a pressurized system of super critical water
 Rupture (social networking), a social networking site for computer gamers
 Earthquake rupture, an event that generates seismic energy as a result of slip on a fault
 "Rupture" (The Flash episode), an episode in season two of The Flash
Rupture (1983 film), a Soviet drama film
 Rupture (2016 film), a science fiction film by Steven Shainberg
Rupture (2017 film), a Canadian short drama film
 as a proper name
 DJ /rupture, a New York-based DJ and producer
 Rupture (band), an Australian hardcore punk band